Nils Robert Backlund (25 October 1896 – 3 December 1964) was a Swedish water polo player who competed in the 1920 Summer Olympics and in the 1924 Summer Olympics. In 1920 he was part of the Swedish team, which was able to win the bronze medal. In the 1924 water polo competition his team finished in fourth place.

See also
 List of Olympic medalists in water polo (men)

References

External links
 

1896 births
1964 deaths
Swedish male water polo players
Water polo players at the 1920 Summer Olympics
Water polo players at the 1924 Summer Olympics
Olympic water polo players of Sweden
Olympic bronze medalists for Sweden
Olympic medalists in water polo
Medalists at the 1920 Summer Olympics
20th-century Swedish people